Michelle Yvette Busha was a formerly unidentified murder victim discovered in Blue Earth, Minnesota in 1980. Her murder was solved in 1989, but she remained unidentified for years following the confession of Robert Leroy Nelson, who was a former Minnesota State Trooper. Busha's remains were identified in 2015 after a DNA profile was obtained following the exhumation of her remains.

Disappearance
Busha and her sister were raised and homeschooled by their mother and stepfather, who were Jehovah's Witnesses. Consequently, the sisters were "highly isolated." Michelle ran away from home when she was 17. She was found over 1,000 miles away in Burlington, Colorado by the police, who proceeded to contact her father, Don Busha, Sr. She was later taken to his residence in Bay City, Texas. 

Busha, described as having a "rebellious" personality, left home at 18 after an argument with her father while living in Bay City, Texas. Don Busha admitted he slapped her and she made the decision to leave Bay City. She was last seen in December 1979 while she was travelling to Louisiana. She made calls to her family from Mississippi and Indiana between January and May 1980. After the calls stopped, loved ones feared for her safety. On May 9, 1980, she was reported missing. 

Michelle's father kept the same phone number and address, hoping she would contact him again.

Murder
Minnesota State Trooper Robert Leroy Nelson, while on duty, offered Busha a ride on May 26, 1980 after witnessing her being dropped off by a vehicle near the Bricelyn overpass along Interstate 90. Busha was raped, beaten, tortured and strangled with a ligature. Her fingernails were removed while she was still alive and her head had been shaved, except for an area in the back of the head, which was left about an inch long. After her murder, the body was moved to a ditch along Interstate 90 and her clothing and personal items were removed and disposed of.

The decomposed, nude body was discovered about three days to one week after her death. Heavy rains had washed her body into a visible area, where it was discovered by a farmer among broken corn plants. The unidentified victim was estimated to be between the ages of 20 and 35. It appeared she was a transient, as her feet were "heavily calloused." She was 5'3" and weighed 128 pounds. Her left ear, at least, had been pierced and she had an overbite.

Near the scene, bloodied clothing and a Texas driver's license were found. The blood was later found to be that of an animal and the license was counterfeit. The body was later buried in the Riverside Cemetery in Blue Earth in an unmarked grave.

Investigation
After Busha was reported missing on May 9, 1980, various efforts were made to locate her. In February 1984, a potential match was noticed with a set of remains discovered in New York. In May 1984, her dental records were compared to that of an unidentified woman, known as the Cheerleader in the Trunk, who was discovered in Maryland in 1982. She was excluded as a potential match to both decedents.

The unidentified victim's fingerprints and dental records were compared against missing persons from Colorado and Minnesota but did not line up with any of the potential matches. Fliers describing the case were distributed nationally. Henry Lee Lucas confessed to killing a young woman along Interstate 90 in the area, but when questioned in prison during 1983, he gave details inconsistent with the murder and was excluded as a suspect.

In June 1988, while in police custody in Smith County, Texas, former Minnesota State Trooper Robert Leroy Nelson confessed to murdering the victim while on duty. He claimed he did not know her name, but she apparently was travelling to Idaho or Oregon and she had spent time in the Milwaukee, Wisconsin area. He admitted to handcuffing her to prevent her escape. Police found his confession credible, as he stated he had removed her fingernails, a fact that had not been released publicly at the time. He pleaded guilty to first-degree manslaughter, while he was already serving two life sentences. He was sentenced to an additional 86 months on August 25, 1989. Nelson had left Minnesota after becoming involved with a religious cult.

Blue Earth resident Deborah Anderson became intrigued by the case in 2002 and made efforts to bring the murder into the public eye. Anderson met with officials and presented a plan to raise funds for the victim's exhumation, which was eventually scheduled for late July 2014.  On August 12, 2014, the body was exhumed for DNA information, which was successfully obtained. The entire process would have cost approximately $10,000, but the exhumation was performed without cost by a local funeral home and construction companies, leaving only the $1,000 cost for the actual DNA testing. In 2004, hairs from the body were examined and a mitochondrial DNA profile (always much less specific than a nuclear DNA profile due to the far lower number of genes contained in mitochondrial DNA) was developed. Authorities had previously taken her dental information and obtained a single fingerprint from the remains to compare against potential matches. Following the exhumation, a new facial reconstruction was created by the National Center for Missing & Exploited Children via an MRI scan. Isotope testing was also performed on a tooth by the Smithsonian Institution to identify regions where the victim may have lived prior to her death. Results from the examination indicated the victim was 17 to 23 years old and was likely white with a possible African admixture.

On March 5, 2015, samples obtained from her family in 2007 were matched to her remains. Dental records were compared as well. The body was officially identified on March 13. The remains were then cremated and released to the Busha family on April 9, 2015.

See also
List of solved missing person cases

References

1970s missing person cases
1980 murders in the United States
Deaths by strangulation in the United States 
Formerly missing people
Missing person cases in Minnesota
People murdered by law enforcement officers in the United States
Rapes in the United States
Torture in the United States
Violence against women in the United States
Murders by law enforcement officers in the United States
Blue Earth County, Minnesota
Female murder victims
History of women in Minnesota